Don Byron Colton (September 15, 1876 – August 1, 1952) was a U.S. Representative from Utah.

Early life
Born near Mona, Juab County, Utah Territory, Colton moved with his parents to Uintah County, Utah Territory in 1879. He attended the public schools and the Uintah Academy, Vernal, Utah. He was graduated from the commercial department of Brigham Young University, Provo, Utah, in 1896. He graduated from the law department of the University of Michigan at Ann Arbor in 1905. He was admitted to the bar the same year and commenced practice in Vernal, Utah.

Political career
Colton was receiver of the United States land office at Vernal 1905–1914. He served as delegate to the Republican National Conventions in 1904, 1924, and 1928 as well as a delegate to the Republican State conventions 1914–1924. He was an unsuccessful candidate for United States Senator in 1934. He was an unsuccessful candidate for Governor of Utah in 1940.

Utah House of Representatives
Colton served as member of the Utah House of Representatives in 1903. He also served as member of the State senate 1915–1917.

Congress
Colton was elected as a Republican to the Sixty-seventh and to the five succeeding Congresses (March 4, 1921 – March 3, 1933). He served as chairman of the Committee on Elections No. 1 (Sixty-ninth and Seventieth Congresses), Committee on Public Lands (Seventieth and Seventy-first Congresses). He was an unsuccessful candidate for reelection in 1932 to the Seventy-third Congress. While in Congress Colton served as the Sunday School teacher for the LDS Church Sunday School in Washington, D.C.

Other
He engaged in teaching in 1898, 1901, and 1902. Colton resumed the practice of law in Vernal, Utah.

From 1910–1921 Colton served as the president of the Uintah Stake of the Church of Jesus Christ of Latter-day Saints (LDS Church). From 1933 to 1937, Colton served as president of the Eastern States Mission of the LDS Church.

He moved to Salt Lake City in 1937 and continued the practice of law.

He also engaged in farming, ranching, sheep and stock raising, and other business enterprises.

Death
Colton died in Salt Lake City, Utah, August 1, 1952.  Immediately prior to this he was serving as the head of the LDS Church mission home in Salt Lake City.  Colton had been serving in this position since he had taken over from J. Wyley Sessions in 1938.

Colton was interred in Wasatch Lawn Cemetery.

Sources

1876 births
1952 deaths
20th-century American politicians
20th-century Mormon missionaries
American leaders of the Church of Jesus Christ of Latter-day Saints
American Mormon missionaries in the United States
Brigham Young University alumni
Latter Day Saints from Utah
Republican Party members of the Utah House of Representatives
Mission presidents (LDS Church)
People from Juab County, Utah
People from Vernal, Utah
Republican Party members of the United States House of Representatives from Utah
University of Michigan Law School alumni
Utah lawyers
Republican Party Utah state senators